Corn cheese is a Korean dish made of sweet corn (often canned) and mozzarella cheese (often shredded). It is often served as anju (food accompanying alcoholic beverages).

Preparation 
Sweet corn kernels are sautéed with butter on a skillet, optionally with a little bit of onions, bell peppers, or other vegetables diced in the same size as corn kernels (in which case, the diced vegetables are lightly salted and squeezed to remove water). Mayonnaise and optionally sugar is mixed in, and mozzarella cheese is added over the sautéed corn mixture. It is then broiled in an oven until the cheese browns and served still sizzling in the skillet.

References 

Cheese dishes
Korean vegetable dishes
Maize dishes